Alma Hilaj (born 2 February 2000) is an Albanian professional footballer who plays as a midfielder for Italian Serie A club FC Como Women and the Albania women's national team.

See also
List of Albania women's international footballers

References

2000 births
Living people
Footballers from Shkodër
Albanian footballers
Albanian women's footballers
Women's association football midfielders
Florentia San Gimignano S.S.D. players
Serie A (women's football) players
Albania women's international footballers
Albanian expatriate footballers
Albanian expatriate sportspeople in Italy
Expatriate women's footballers in Italy
S.S.D. F.C. Como Women players